Isam Faiz (Arabic:عصام فايز) (born 6 March 2000) is a Moroccan footballer who plays as a midfielder for Ajman Club.

Career statistics

Club

External links

References

2000 births
Moroccan footballers
Moroccan expatriate footballers
Living people
Olympique Club de Khouribga players
Ajman Club players
Expatriate footballers in the United Arab Emirates
Moroccan expatriate sportspeople in the United Arab Emirates
UAE Pro League players
Association football midfielders
Place of birth missing (living people)